Wichard von Pohlheim was Bishop of Passau from 1280 to  1282.

Biography
The year of his birth is unknown.
As bishop he was a sponsor of the Cistercian monasteries of Fürstenzell and Heiligenkreuz as well as of the Dominican nunnery at Niederaltaich, he also founded the Franciscan monastery of Wels. He took part in the provincial synod in Salzburg in 1281. Various reforms were planned for the World and Order clergy, which were still connected with the efforts of Bishop Otto von Lonsdorf. He died on 17 December 1282 in Vienna.

References

Year of birth unknown
Year of death unknown
Roman Catholic bishops of Passau
13th-century Roman Catholic bishops in Bavaria